Eilish McColgan (born 25 November 1990) is a Scottish middle- and long-distance runner. She is the 2022 Commonwealth Games 10,000 metres champion with the Games record, and 5000 metres silver medallist. McColgan is a four-time European Championships medallist, winning silver medals for the 5000 m in 2018 and 10,000 m in 2022, bronze in the 5000 m in 2022, and a bronze for the indoor 3000 metres in 2017. She is the European record holder for the 10 km road race, and the British record holder for the 5000 m, 10,000 m, 5 km and half marathon. She also holds the European best in the 10 miles on the roads.

McColgan represented Great Britain at the 2012 London, 2016 Rio and 2020 Tokyo Olympics. She represented Scotland at Commonwealth Games in 2014 in Glasgow, in 2018 in Gold Coast in addition to the 2022 Games in Birmingham. She is the Scottish record holder in the event she originally specialised in, the 3000 metres steeplechase, from 2013 before injury forced her to move away from steeplechase. She holds the Scottish record in 10,000 metres. McColgan is a seven-time national champion.

Early and personal life
Eilish McColgan was born in Dundee, Scotland to Liz and Peter McColgan, both athletes. She is a member of Dundee's Hawkhill Harriers Club and is coached by her mother, former 10,000 metres World Champion and Olympic silver medallist Elizabeth Nuttell known more commonly during her racing career as Liz McColgan.

She attended the High School of Dundee and studied mathematics and accountancy at the University of Dundee, graduating in 2013.

Following her mother's second marriage, McColgan is step-daughter of long-distance runner John Nuttall and step-sister of his son, para-athlete Luke Nuttall. Her partner is former international middle-distance runner for Great Britain and England Michael Rimmer.

She currently resides in East Didsbury where she can often be spotted training around Manchester.

Career
In 2006, she won a silver medal at the Scottish Schools Championships in the 1500 metres and a bronze medal at the International Under-17s Schools Championships. In 2007, she came fifth in the Scottish Senior Championships 1500 metres. At the 2008 Scottish Indoor Championships she won a bronze medal in the 1500 m.

McColgan was selected for the 2008 Commonwealth Youth Games in India but suffered a major knee injury which it took her a year-and-a-half to recover from. She also missed the 2011 World Championships, held in Daegu, South Korea, after breaking her foot at a Diamond League event in London. Her senior debut for Great Britain came at the 2011 European Team Championships in Stockholm, Sweden. Initially selected as a travelling reserve to cover a range of events, she was called upon to compete in the 3000 metres steeplechase, an event which she had only competed in twice before, and ran a personal best while finishing ninth. She came fourth in the 1500 metres at the 2011 UK Indoor Championships and won the silver medal in the 5000 metres at the UK Outdoor Championships. She won the gold medal in the 1500 m at the 2011 Scottish University Championships.

McColgan won two gold medals at the 2012 Scottish Universities Indoor Championships, placing first in both the 1500 and 3000 metres events. In June 2012 at a meeting in Oslo, Norway she ran a time of 9:38.45 to beat the Olympic 'A' qualification standard in the 3000 metres steeplechase. McColgan confirmed her qualification for the steeplechase at the 2012 Summer Olympics in London by winning the British trials in a time of 9:56.90. She was the only athlete to finish in under 10 minutes and the only British athlete to have achieved the 'A' qualifying standard. After achieving Olympic qualification, McColgan chose not to compete at the 2012 European Athletics Championships in Helsinki, Finland. She competed for Great Britain team for the 2012 Summer Olympics in the women's 3000 m steeplechase alongside compatriot Barbara Parker. Her time of 9:54.36 was not sufficient for her to reach the final.

Having competed in the steeplechase at the Commonwealth Games Glasgow 2014, the Dundonian switched from the barriers to the flat following a serious foot injury.

At the 2016 Olympic Games in Rio de Janeiro, she reached the final of the women's 5000 metres.

McColgan qualified for the 3000 metres at the 2018 IAAF World Indoor Championships where she finished in a top ten position. In the 5000 metres event at the 2018 European Athletics Championships in Berlin, she won the silver medal. In October, she won the Great South Run in Portsmouth, clocking 54:43 in her maiden run at the 10 mile distance. Her mother had won the race twice previously, in 1995 and 1997.

In 2019, her training regime included a daily run, cross training and a track session twice a week. The Scotswoman finished tenth in the 5000 m event at the 2019 World Athletics Championships held in Doha, setting a personal best of 14:46.17.

2021
On 1 July in Oslo, McColgan set a British 5000 m record with her time of 14:28.55, beating the 17-year mark of Paula Radcliffe.

Qualified for the delayed 2020 Tokyo Olympics in Japan, she failed to advance to the 5000 m final on 30 July, finishing in 10th place of her heat in a time of 15:09.68. A few days later, she also competed in the 10,000 m event, finishing ninth in the final with a time of 31:04.46.

In September, she finished runner-up to Hellen Obiri in the half marathon at the Great North Run in 67:48, and won the 10 km race at the Great Manchester Run in 30:52.

After a long track season, on 17 October, McColgan won for the third time the Great South Run in a time of 50m 43s, breaking Sonia O'Sullivan's course record and the European best mark for the 10 miles. She took almost half a minute off Radcliffe's UK record, and two seconds off the previous European best held by Israel's Lonah Chemtai Salpeter. Thus, McColgan improved on double win of her mother.

2022
In February, the Dundonian set a new British record in the 5 km road race, clocking 14:48 in Dubai to break the mark of 14:51 set by Paula Radcliffe in 2003. McColgan bettered her mother's unofficial 14:57 from 1991, and was only four seconds short of a European record. Later that month, she beat Radcliffe's 21-year-old British half marathon record by 21 seconds, in a time of one hour six minutes 26 seconds, improving her mother's best yet again (1:07:11).

In March, McColgan launched a non-profit organisation Giving Back to Track with her partner Michael Rimmer with the aim to encourage young people to get involved in athletics and to fund the next generation of female athletes.

In May, she broke Radcliffe's European 10 km record at the Great Manchester Run in a time of 30 minutes 19 seconds, shaving two seconds off the previous marker set by Radcliffe in 2003. McColgan finished second behind only Hellen Obiri who set the course record of 30:15. In June at the FBK Games in Hengelo, she set a new Scottish 10,000 m record of 30:19.02, beating the time set by her mother at the same venue in 1991.

After experiencing some health problems before the World Championships in Eugene, Oregon in July, McColgan finished there 11th in the 5000 metres and 10th over the 10,000 metres.

On 3 August, the 31-year-old claimed the first major title of her career as she won the gold medal in the 10,000 metres final at the Commonwealth Games in Birmingham. Her winning time of 30:48:60 was a new Games record, breaking her mother's 32-year mark. Thus, she completed the family hat-trick as her mother won over the same distance at Commonwealth Games Edinburgh 1986 and Auckland 1990. McColgan later added silver in the 5000 metres, which marked Scotland's 500th overall medal at the Commonwealth Games.

The Dundonian continued her outstanding season at about a week later securing two additional medals at the European Championships Munich 2022. First she won a silver in the 10,000 metres (behind Yasemin Can), and added bronze for the 5000 metres three days later (behind Konstanze Klosterhalfen and Can), becoming the first British distance runner to compete in six championships outdoor finals in the same season.

In September, McColgan set a course record and the joint-fourth fastest women's half marathon in British history at the Big Half in London with a time of 67m 35s. She improved the previous best mark by more than two minutes.

She had to withdraw from the 2022 London Marathon due to 'rebound hypoglycemia' refuelling problems. McColgan apparently improved by a second her own European 10 kilometres record, which she set earlier that year in Manchester, when winning at the Great Scottish Run in Glasgow in October. However, the record set in Glasgow was invalidated when it was found that the course was 150 m short. In November, she set a new British record in the 15 kilometres with her fourth-place finish in a time of 47:40 at the Zevenheuvelenloop in Netherlands, breaking her mother's official record of 47:43.

2023
On 4 March, after five weeks of altitude training in Colorado, McColgan broke Radcliffe’s 21-year British 10,000 m record by 0.23 s with a time of 30:00.86 at the Sound Running The TEN in San Juan Capistrano, California. In Europe only Sifan Hassan had run faster.

Achievements

Personal bests
Information from World Athletics profile unless otherwise noted.

 1500 metres: 4:00.97 (Rabat 2019)
 One mile: 4:24.71 Birmingham (2019)
 3000 metres: 8:31.00 (Birmingham 2017)
 5000 metres: 14:28.55 (Oslo 2021) 
 10,000 metres: 30:00.86 (San Juan Capistrano, CA 2023) 
 3000 metres steeplechase: 9:35.82 (Moscow 2013) ( Scottish)
Road
 5 kilometres: 14:45 (Málaga 2022)  
 10 kilometres: 30:19 (Manchester 2022) European record
 10 miles: 50:43 (Portsmouth 2021) European best
 Half marathon: 1:06:26 (Ras Al Khaimah 2022)

National titles
 British Athletics Championships
 5000 metres: 2019
 10,000 metres: 2021
 3000 m steeplechase: 2012, 2013, 2014
 British Indoor Athletics Championships
 1500 metres: 2018
 3000 metres: 2017
 Scottish Athletics Championships
 3000 m steeplechase: 2011

Competition record

Awards and honours
2022
 British Athletics Writers' Association: Cliff Temple Award for British Female Athlete of the Year (jointly with Laura Muir)
 BT Sport Action Woman of the Year
 Sunday Times Sportswoman of the Year
 Sports Journalists' Association: SJA Committee Award
 British Athletics Supporters Club's Athlete of the Year
 Women's Sport Alliance Athlete of the Year
 Scottish Women in Sport Sportswoman of the Year
 Scottish Athletics Commonwealth Games Achievement Trophy
 Scottish Sports Awards: Moment of the Year
 Athletics Weekly: British Female Athlete of the Year
 University of Dundee Honorary Doctor of Laws degree

References

External links

 
 
 

1990 births
Living people
Sportspeople from Dundee
British female steeplechase runners
British female long-distance runners
British female middle-distance runners
Scottish female steeplechase runners
Scottish female long-distance runners
Scottish female middle-distance runners
Olympic female steeplechase runners
Olympic female long-distance runners
Olympic athletes of Great Britain
Athletes (track and field) at the 2012 Summer Olympics
Athletes (track and field) at the 2016 Summer Olympics
Athletes (track and field) at the 2020 Summer Olympics
Athletes (track and field) at the 2014 Commonwealth Games
Athletes (track and field) at the 2018 Commonwealth Games
Athletes (track and field) at the 2022 Commonwealth Games
World Athletics Championships athletes for Great Britain
British Athletics Championships winners
People educated at the High School of Dundee
Alumni of the University of Dundee
Commonwealth Games gold medallists for Scotland
Commonwealth Games medallists in athletics
European Athletics Championships medalists
20th-century Scottish women
21st-century Scottish women
Scottish people of Irish descent
Medallists at the 2022 Commonwealth Games